Zak Ové (born 1966) is a British-Trinidad visual artist who works between sculpture, film and photography, living in London, UK, and Trinidad. His themes reflect "his documentation of and anthropological interest in diasporic and African history, specifically that which is explored through Trinidadian carnival." In work that is "filtered through his own personal and cultural upbringing, with a black Trinidadian father and white Irish mother", he has exhibited widely in Europe, the United States and Africa, participating in international museum shows in London, Dakar, Paris, Dubai, Prague, Berlin, Johannesburg, Bamako and New York City. His father is the filmmaker Horace Ové and his sister is the actress Indra Ové.

Biography

Born in London, UK, Zak Ové throughout his teens assisted his father Horace Ové on numerous film shoots, before earning a BA in Film as Fine Art from St. Martin's School of Art (1984–87). Ové provided the video for the segment "Begin the Beguine" performed by Salif Keita on Red Hot + Blue, a 1990 compilation album featuring contemporary pop performers reinterpreting songs of Cole Porter.

In July 2015, Ové's "Moko Jumbie" sculptures, commissioned to tie in with the Notting Hill Carnival and inspired by aspects of African Masquerade, were installed in the Great Court at the British Museum as part of the Celebrating Africa exhibition there, before ultimately being moved to the Africa Galleries, with Ové as the first Caribbean artist to enter the museum’s permanent collection. In March 2017 Ové's Moko Jumbie figures were installed at the British Museum as part of the Sainsbury African Galleries, the first time in the museum's history that work the work of a Caribbean sculptor has been on permanent display in the African collection.

In October 2016, his installation Black and Blue: The Invisible Man and the Masque of Blackness, comprising an "army" of 40 two-metre-high graphite statues, was assembled in the courtyard of Somerset House, where the 1:54 Contemporary African Art Fair was taking place. The journal Art Radar described Ové's work as "one of the standouts of the fair", and the Financial Times reported that it had quickly found a buyer: "Modern Forms, a contemporary art platform founded by Hussam Otaibi, managing partner of the investment group Floreat, and Nick Hackworth, the curator who previously ran London’s Paradise Row gallery, bought one of three editions of the 40 identical, life-size sculptures of Nubian masked men, priced at £300,000, through London’s Vigo gallery. The plan is for Ové's installation to be part of a sculpture park that Modern Forms is creating at a property in Berkshire." Ové's Black and Blue: The Invisible Man and the Masque of Blackness is part of a series of new open-air displays celebrating the 40th anniversary of the Yorkshire Sculpture Park.

Ové curated the major exhibition Get Up, Stand Up Now; Generations of Black Creative Pioneers mounted at Somerset House from 12 June to 15 September 2019, celebrating "the past 50 years of Black creativity in Britain and beyond ... spanning art, film, photography, music, literature, design and fashion". Described by Ové as "a review and a celebration of our Caribbean and African culture that has permeated and contributed to British society", and taking its starting point as the radical work of his father Horace Ové, the exhibition showcased interdisciplinary contributions from 100 Black creatives, including Armet Francis, Black Audio Film Collective, Charlie Phillips, Dennis Bovell, Ebony G. Patterson, Gaika, Glenn Ligon, Hank Willis Thomas, Hassan Hajjaj, Jenn Nkiru, Larry Achiampong, Margaret Busby, Ronan McKenzie, Vanley Burke, Yinka Shonibare, Denzil Forrester, Martine Rose, Grace Wales Bonner, Steve McQueen, Betye Saar, Zadie Smith, among others.

Solo exhibitions
2008:  Black & White Nudes, Carte Blanche Gallery, London
2009:  Blue Devils, Real Art Ways Museum, Connecticut
2010:  Past Future, Fine Art Society, London
2010:  Twice Is Too Much, The Freies Museum, Berlin
2013–14: Speaker, Vigo Gallery, London
2014: Arms Around The Child, No1 Mayfair, London

Group exhibitions
2009: Encomium, Fine Art Society, London
2009: Encounters of Bamako, Panafrican Exhibition, National Museum, Bamako, Mali
2009: Rockstone and Bootheel, Real Art Ways, Connecticut
2010: Africa: See You, See Me, Museu da Cidade, Lisbon
2010: Encounters Of Bamako, B-Gallery European centre for contemporary Art, Brussels
2010: Encounters of Bamako, Johannesburg Art Gallery, Johannesburg
2010: Encounters of Bamako, Panafrican Exhibition tour, Foto Museum, Antwerp
2010: Encounters of Bamako, South African National Gallery, Cape Town
2010: Fesman 2010: World Festival of Black Arts, Dakar, Senegal
2010: Hell’s Half Acre, Lazarides Gallery, London
2010: Tough Love, Plataforma Revólver, Lisbon
2010: We Are Not Witches, The Saatchi Gallery, London
2011: Africa See You See me, Li – Space, Beijing
2011: Africa: See You, See Me, Fondazione Studio Maragoni, Florence
2011: Africa: See You, See Me, Officine Fotografiche, Rome
2011: Carnaval and Masquerade, Musée Dapper, Paris
2011: Encounters of Bamako, Fundacao Calouste Gulbenkian, Lisbon
2011: Fine Art Society, London Art Fair, London
2011: Fine Arts Society, Volta NY, New York
2011: Go Tell it To The Mountain, 3D Sculpture Park, Verbier, Switzerland
2011: Karen Jenkins Johnson Gallery, Texas contemporary fair, Houston
2011: LA Platform, Karen Jenkins Johnson Gallery, Los Angeles
2011: Sculpture today – New Forces New Forms, Frederik Meijer Sculpture Park, Michigan
2011: Stephen Burks | Are You A Hybrid, Museum of Art and Design, New York
2011: The Minotaur, Lazarides Gallery, Old Vic Tunnels, London
2011: The Return Of The House Of The Nobleman, The House of the Nobleman, London
2012: British, Vigo Gallery, London
2012: London Twelve, City of Prague Museum, Czech Republic
2012: New Re-Visions, House of The Nobleman, London, UK
2012: The Future Can Wait – Charlie Smith, London, UK
2012: Vigo Gallery, London Art Fair, London
2012: Vigo Gallery, London Art Fair, London
2012: Voices of Home, Jenkins Johnson Gallery, New York
2012; Ululation, Vigo Gallery, London, UK
2013: 1:54 Contemporary African Art Fair, Somerset House, London
2013: Glasstress: White Light / White Heat, Venice Biennale, Venice
2013–14: Chaos Into Clarity: Re-Possessing a Funktioning Utopia, Sharjah Art Foundation, Dubai
2014: ART14, London (February – March)
2014: House of Barnabas, London (March)
2015: d’Assemblages” Dapper Museum, Paris
2016: 1:54 Contemporary African Art Fair, Somerset House, London
2016: Untitled Art Fair, Miami
2019: Get Up, Stand Up Now; Generations of Black Creative Pioneers, Somerset House, London

See also
 Invisible Man and the Masque of Blackness

References

External links
Official website.
Paul Brad, "Speaker: The Art of Zak Ove", Ancient To Future, 28 November 2013.
Kay Montano, "Artist Zak Ove's 'The Invisible Men, ThankdieKay.com, 30 November 2016.
"Zak Ové Gives Art Career Advice", Art Discussion.

1966 births
Living people
21st-century male artists
Alumni of Saint Martin's School of Art
Artists from London
Black British artists
Black British photographers
British contemporary artists
British people of Trinidad and Tobago descent
Photographers from London